The Fengyuan Museum of Lacquer Art is a museum about lacquer art in Fengyuan District, Taichung, Taiwan.

History
The idea for the museum establishment dated back during the Japanese rule where Fengyuan was the center for lacquer craftmanship and also the commercial center. The museum was opened on 26 May 2002 by the joint cooperation between Taichung City Government, Taichung City Cultural Affairs Bureau, and Fengyuan District Office.

Architecture
The museum is housed in a 2-story building where the ground floor houses the exhibition, education and leisure centers of lacquer craftmanship and the upper floor houses the cultural life of lacquer.

Exhibitions
The museum has the following rooms:

 Exhibition Room
 Demonstration Room
 Research and Education Room

Transportation
The museum is accessible east from Fengyuan Station of the Taiwan Railways.

See also
 List of museums in Taiwan

References

2002 establishments in Taiwan
Art museums established in 2002
Art museums and galleries in Taiwan
Decorative arts museums
Museums in Taichung